Jiho Lee (born July 29, 1985) is a South Korean male model.

Biography
Lee was born in Seoul, South Korea. When he was young, he moved to Syracuse, New York because of his parents' job and became a fluent English speaker. He attended college at Korea National Sport University where he earned a degree in physical education.

Career
Lee officially appeared as a professional model through photography by Haruehun Airry and quickly became widely recognized even though he in fact began fitness modeling a few years before. He then modeled for some of the biggest names in fashion industry such as attitude, Kenneth Cole and ELLE Fashion Week. Lee currently writes a fitness column and models for L'Officiel Hommes Korea where he acts as a magazine contributor. Determined by public voting through SMS, Lee was awarded the Straight Guy of the Year 2011 by attitude Thailand.

See also
 Haruehun Airry

References

External links
 Jiho Lee on Facebook

1985 births
Living people
South Korean male models
People from Seoul
Korea National Sport University alumni
South Korean emigrants to the United States